Mamathi Chari (born 21 December 1978) is an Indian radio jockey, television personality and actress who predominantly appears in Tamil films and television shows. She is very well known for hosting the television show Vanakkam Tamizha and appearing as an actress in the soap opera Vani Rani.

Personal life
Mamathi was born on December 21, 1978, in Chennai, Tamil Nadu. She studied at Sacred Heart Matriculation Higher Secondary School and later attended I.P Pavlov, where she graduated Medicine. After her divorce, she took a hiatus from the entertainment industry and became a businesswoman. She came back to the limelight in 2017. However in 2020 she announced that she permanently is going to quit the television industry and focus on medical school.

Career
Mamathi worked as an RJ for Big FM's Big Vanakkam in 2007 before working as a host for several television shows. She made her acting debut in the soap opera Vani Rani which aired on Sun TV 2013. She played the dual role of Kokila Saaminathan and Jessie both antagonist characters. She later appeared as a radio jockey on the television show Vanakkam Tamizha which also aired on Sun TV. In 2018 she participated in the reality show which aired on Star Vijay called Bigg Boss (Tamil season 2) participating as a contestant, however she was later evicted from the house on day 14 of the show. After her eviction from the show she acted in the mini web series called Time Enna Boss!? in 2020.

In 2022, she announced her return after a 2 years hiatus and was cast in a supporting role in the upcoming film Thunivu alongside actors Ajith Kumar and Manju Warrier. The film is set to release in 2023.

Filmography

Television

References

External links 

Indian film actresses
1978 births
Living people
Actresses in Tamil cinema
21st-century Indian actresses
Bigg Boss (Tamil TV series) contestants